Osceola Municipal Airport  is a city-owned, public-use airport located two nautical miles (4 km) southwest of the central business district of Osceola, a city in Mississippi County, Arkansas, United States. It is included in the National Plan of Integrated Airport Systems for 2011–2015, which categorized it as a general aviation facility.

Facilities and aircraft 
Osceola Municipal Airport covers an area of 110 acres (45 ha) at an elevation of 234 feet (71 m) above mean sea level. It has one runway designated 1/19 with an asphalt surface measuring 3,800 by 75 feet (1,158 x 23 m).

For the 12-month period ending June 30, 2012, the airport had 9,100 aircraft operations, an average of 24 per day: 99% general aviation and 1% air taxi. At that time there were eight single-engine aircraft based at this airport.

References

External links 
 Osceola Municipal (7M4) at the Arkansas Department of Aeronautics
 Aerial image as of March 2001 from USGS The National Map
 
 

Airports in Arkansas
Transportation in Mississippi County, Arkansas